Goodspeed Musicals is a non-profit organization dedicated to the preservation and advancement of musical theater and the creation of new works, located in East Haddam, Connecticut. A distinctive feature of the view from the Connecticut River, the Goodspeed Opera House is the birthplace of some of the world's most famous musicals, including Annie, Man of La Mancha, and Shenandoah.

Goodspeed Opera House 
The Opera House was originally built by a local merchant and banker, William Henry Goodspeed.  Construction began in 1876 and finished in 1877. Despite the name, it was not in fact an opera house, but rather a venue for presenting plays. Its first play, Charles II, opened on October 24, 1877. After William Goodspeed's death in 1882, the opera house fell into disrepair, facing a series of less glamorous uses—from a militia base during World War I to a general store and a Department of Transportation storage facility.

The building is unique for a theater.  The theater itself is actually located on the top two floors of the building, making for interesting and sometimes difficult scenery and show load-ins.  Scenery is loaded-in from the dock area up a vacant elevator shaft that is now outfitted with a winch system to haul the scenery up to the stage level.  Much care has to be taken in order to get the scenery up the shaft without scratching or ruining the scenery.  One story told around Goodspeed is that while loading in the scenery for Annie's original pre-Broadway run, a strong gust of wind took a large piece of scenery out of the hands of the loaders and blew it into the Connecticut River.

Goodspeed Musicals 

Goodspeed Musicals was formed in 1959 by a group of concerned citizens after the state of Connecticut had condemned the building. The state agreed to sell the building to the group for one dollar, provided they acquire enough funding to restore and maintain it. The restoration project took nearly four years, and the Goodspeed Opera House was rededicated on June 8, 1963.  The first performance in the new opera house was Oh, Lady! Lady! Under the direction of Michael P. Price from 1968 to 2014, and Michael Gennaro since 2014, Goodspeed Musicals has sent 19 productions to Broadway.  Goodspeed productions have won more than a dozen Tony Awards, while Goodspeed Musicals itself has won two special Tonys, one for outstanding contributions to American Musicals and the other for outstanding achievement by a regional theatre.

In 1984, Goodspeed Musicals added a second performance venue—the Norma Terris Theatre—in nearby Chester, Connecticut.  While the main stage presents a mixture of revivals and new musicals as part of its 3 production season, The Norma Terris also presents three new musicals each season.  Several original plays debuted there or at the opera house before going on to Broadway and winning Tony Awards.

In addition to the two theaters, Goodspeed Musicals pursues its mission through the Max Showalter Center for Education in Musical Theatre, which offers internships and new writers' residency programs, as well as the Scherer Library of Musical Theatre, which houses the largest musical theatre research facility in the United States. Goodspeed Musicals has also built state-of-the-art production facilities including scenery shops, costume shops and a large costume storage facility.

Critic fellows from the Eugene O'Neill Theater Center in Waterford, CT travel to the Goodspeed each summer to practice reviewing full productions.

Tours of many of the Goodspeed facilities can be scheduled in advance for a small fee.  Tickets to the opera house or theatre productions should be ordered in advance as most performances in the relatively small theater sell-out quickly.

See also

National Register of Historic Places listings in Middlesex County, Connecticut

References

External links
 Goodspeed Musicals official website
 
 Google Virtual Tour of Goodspeed Opera House
 Goodspeed on Atlas Obscura

1977 establishments in Connecticut
East Haddam, Connecticut
League of Resident Theatres
Theatres in Connecticut
Tony Award winners
Regional theatre in the United States
Tourist attractions in Middlesex County, Connecticut
Buildings and structures in Middlesex County, Connecticut
Theatre companies in Connecticut
Theatres completed in 1877
National Register of Historic Places in Middlesex County, Connecticut
Historic district contributing properties in Connecticut
Event venues on the National Register of Historic Places in Connecticut
Opera houses on the National Register of Historic Places
Opera houses in Connecticut
Musical theatre companies